ProDG can refer to:
 ProDG (Belgium), a political party active in the German-speaking community of Belgium
 ProDG (software), a suite of development tools produced by SN Systems